Martin Jones Hawkins (1830 – February 7, 1886) was a Union Army officer in the American Civil War who received the U.S. military's highest decoration, the Medal of Honor.

Hawkins was born in Mercer County, Pennsylvania in 1840 and entered service at Portsmouth, Scioto County, Ohio. He was awarded the Medal of Honor, for extraordinary heroism shown in April 1862 during the Great Locomotive Chase, at Big Shanty, Georgia while serving as a Corporal with Company A, 33rd Ohio Infantry. His Medal of Honor was issued in September 1863.

Hawkins died at the age of 55, on February 7, 1886, and was buried at Woodland Cemetery in Quincy, Illinois.

Medal of Honor citation

See also
Great Locomotive Chase
33rd Ohio Infantry
Big Shanty, Georgia
List of Andrews Raiders

Notes

References

External links
Andrews' Raid

1830 births
1886 deaths
People from Mercer County, Pennsylvania
Burials in Illinois
Union Army officers
United States Army Medal of Honor recipients
American Civil War recipients of the Medal of Honor
Great Locomotive Chase
Military personnel from Pennsylvania